Pointe de l'Aiglière is a mountain in the French Alps.  Located in the Massif des Écrins, the mountain is 3,307 m tall.

References

External links

 Pointe de l'Aiglière at vallouimages.com.

Mountains of Isère
Mountains of Hautes-Alpes
Mountains of the Alps
Alpine three-thousanders